Myrciaria cuspidata, commonly known as , or  is a species of plant in the family Myrtaceae. It is found in coastal forests and semideciduous forests in Brazil, Paraguay and Argentina. It grows slowly to a semideciduous shrub or small tree, between 3 and 6 metres tall, with orange or black berries around 10mm in diameter.

Etymology 
The name Cambuím comes from Tupi–Guarani and means "fruit that is born on the thin branch".

References

cuspidata
Vulnerable plants
Taxonomy articles created by Polbot
Crops originating from the Americas
Tropical fruit
Flora of South America
Fruits originating in South America
Cauliflory
Fruit trees
Berries